General James Hoth Mai (born November 30, 1959) is a South Sudanese army officer. He served as Chief of General Staff of the Sudan People's Liberation Army (SPLA) from 2009 until 2014.

Biography 
Ethnically a member of the Nuer people, Hoth was born in Ulang County, Upper Nile. He joined the Sudan People's Liberation Army (SPLA) in 1983, and fought with it against the Sudanese government in the Second Sudanese Civil War. Rising in the ranks, he served as head of the SPLA's commandos, was appointed chief of operations for several SPLA offensives named "Operation Jungle Storm" between 1993 and 1995, and took part in Operation Thunderbolt (1997). By the end of the civil war in 2005, Hoth served as Deputy Chief of Staff for Logistics in the SPLA.

Formally Deputy Chief of Staff for Operations, then Deputy Chief of Staff for Logistics, he preplaced Oyay Deng Ajak as Chief of General Staff in May 2009. Promoted to lieutenant general in his new position, he was then promoted to full general in July 2010. In April 2014 he was sacked by president Salva Kiir Mayardit.

Hoth Mai holds a Master's degree in Public Administration from the University of Fort Hare in South Africa.

References

1959 births
Living people
Nuer people
South Sudanese military personnel
University of Fort Hare alumni
People from Upper Nile (state)
People of the South Sudanese Civil War